Seydou Junior Haïdara (born March 5, 1989) is a former professional Canadian football wide receiver. After the 2012 CIS season, he was ranked as the 11th best player in the Canadian Football League’s Amateur Scouting Bureau final rankings for players eligible in the 2013 CFL Draft, and seventh by players in Canadian Interuniversity Sport. He was drafted in the second round and 12th overall by the BC Lions in the 2013 CFL Draft. He played CIS football with the Laval Rouge et Or.

Professional career

BC Lions
Haïdara was drafted by the BC Lions of the Canadian Football League, with the 3rd pick of the 2nd round (12th overall) of the 2013 CFL Draft. He was signed by the Lions on May 27, 2013.

Hamilton Tiger-Cats
Haïdara was traded to the Hamilton Tiger-Cats on May 6, 2015 in exchange for a fifth round pick in the 2015 CFL Draft.

Saskatchewan Roughriders
On June 23, 2015, Haidara was added to the Saskatchewan Roughriders' practice roster. He dressed in nine games and registered eight catches for 58 yards. On June 13, 2016, Haidara was released.

Montreal Alouettes
On August 29, 2016, Haidara signed with the Montreal Alouettes. He retired on March 7, 2019.

References

External links
Montreal Alouettes profile
BC Lions profile 

1989 births
Living people
Players of Canadian football from Quebec
Canadian football wide receivers
Laval Rouge et Or football players
BC Lions players
Sportspeople from Quebec City
Saskatchewan Roughriders players
Montreal Alouettes players